The Amanat River flows through the Chatra and Palamu districts in the Indian state of Jharkhand.

Course
The Amanat originates on the Hazaribagh plateau, and then forms the southern boundary of Lawalong Wildlife Sanctuary, in Simaria police station area of Chatra district. Thereafter, it flows almost due west through Palamu district till it joins the North Koel River five miles north of Daltonganj. It flows through a rich, well cultivated valley; and is the principal drainage channel of the east of the Palamu district.

Tributaries
Its tributaries are: Jinjoi, Sapni, Maila and Piri.

References

Rivers of Jharkhand
Rivers of India